Aliabad-e Robat (also Romanized as ‘Alīābād-e Robāṭ; also known as ‘Alīābād) is a village in Baghin Rural District, in the Central District of Kerman County, Kerman Province, Iran. At the 2006 census, its population was 24, in 4 families.

References 

Populated places in Kerman County